This is a list of roads designated "M1". Road entries are sorted in alphabetical order by country.

Australia

QLD/NSW 
Bruce Highway
Gateway Motorway
Pacific Motorway (Brisbane-Brunswick Heads) 
Pacific Motorway (Grafton Bypass)
Pacific Motorway (Port Macquarie-Coffs Harbour)
Pacific Motorway (Sydney-Newcastle)
Gore Hill Freeway
Warringah Freeway
Sydney Harbour Tunnel
Cahill Expressway
Eastern Distributor
Southern Cross Drive
General Holmes Drive
Princes Motorway

VIC 
Princes Freeway (East)
Monash Freeway
CityLink
West Gate Freeway 
Princes Freeway (west)

SA 
South Eastern Freeway

Europe
 M1 highway (Belarus), a road connecting the border with Poland and the border with Russia
 M1 motorway, a road in England connecting London and Leeds
 M1 motorway (Hungary), a road connecting Budapest and Győr and Hegyeshalom, border to Austria
 M1 motorway (Northern Ireland), a road connecting Belfast and Dungannon
 M1 motorway (Republic of Ireland), a road connecting Dublin to the border with Northern Ireland
 M1 highway (Russia), a road connecting Moscow and the border with Belarus
 M01 highway (Ukraine), a road connecting Kiev and the border with Belarus

Africa

South Africa
 M1 (Johannesburg), a metropolitan route in Johannesburg, South Africa
 M1 road (Pretoria), a metropolitan route in Pretoria, South Africa 
 M1 (Durban), a metropolitan route in Durban, South Africa

Other 
 M1 road (Zambia), a road in Zambia
 M1 Road (Malawi), a road in Malawi

Other
 M1 motorway (Pakistan), a road connecting Peshawar and Rawalpindi
 M-1 (Michigan highway), a road in the United States

See also
 List of highways numbered 1